Rehbein is a surname of German origin. Notable people with the surname include:
Clemens Rehbein (born 1992), German musician
Dick Rehbein (1955–2001), American football coach
Dirk Rehbein (born 1967), German footballer
Herbert Rehbein (1922–1979), German songwriter, composer and arranger of light orchestral music
Karin Rehbein (born 1949), German dressage rider
Michael Rehbein (born 1960), German modern pentathlete

References

Surnames of German origin